Pascoea is a genus of longhorn beetles of the subfamily Lamiinae, containing the following species:

 Pascoea angustana (Kriesche, 1923)
 Pascoea bilunata (Kriesche, 1923)
 Pascoea bimaculata (Gestro, 1876)
 Pascoea brunneoalba Gressitt, 1984
 Pascoea coeruleogrisea Breuning, 1950
 Pascoea degenerata (Heller, 1914)
 Pascoea dohrni (Fairmaire, 1833)
 Pascoea exarata (Pascoe, 1862)
 Pascoea idae White, 1855
 Pascoea meekei Breuning, 1966
 Pascoea mimica Gressitt, 1984
 Pascoea parcemaculata Breuning, 1948
 Pascoea spinicollis (Boisduval, 1835)
 Pascoea thoracica (Thomson, 1864)
 Pascoea torricelliana Gressitt, 1984
 Pascoea undulata Gressitt, 1984

References

Tmesisternini